Milkipur is a town and tehsil in Ayodhya district (formerly Faizabad district) in the Indian state of  Uttar Pradesh. Milkipur is 32 km south of district headquarters Ayodhya city. District Ayodhya consists of 11 blocks and Milkipur is a block in Ayodhya, Uttar Pradesh.

Narendra Dev University of Agriculture and Technology is situated at Kumarganj (a town situated at a distance of about 10 km, south from Milkipur). Tehsil headquarters and Police station of Milkipur tehsil are situated at Inayatnagar, 5 kilometers North-East from Milkipur centre.

History
The town Milkipur and its name originated from the people of Milki Cast who once lived here. The Milki are a Muslim community found in the state of Uttar Pradesh in India. They are also known as Malik, and found entirely in the Awadh region. A small number of Milki are also found in Karachi in Pakistan. The Milki get their name from the fact that their ancestors were a class to whom revenue free grants milk in Persian of land were made during the period of the Delhi Sultanate. They were given these grants of land as an incentive to settle the land. In Unnao District, they were substantial landowners, and played an important role in the history of that district. They were also the scribes, administrators, writers, magistrates, judges. lawyers, chief executive officers and village accountants in the Awadh region. The Milki were also appointed to the position of clerks and official record keepers by the state. As part of their duties, they learnt Turkish and Arabic, economics, administration and taxation. They successfully adapted themselves as scribes and functionaries under the new colonial British. The Milki have much in common with the neighbouring Muslim community, the Kayastha Muslim, with whom they share many traditions and customs. The Milki of Unnao District claim to be Siddiqui Shaikhs, while those of Azamgarh and Ballia claim to be of Turk origin. All the various groups of Milki intermarry, and there are also instances of intermarriage with the Qidwai and Kayastha Muslim communities. Some Milk are Sunni, while other are Shia. They speak standard Urdu, although most also have an understanding of the Awadhi dialect of Hindi.

Geography
It has an average elevation of 94 metres (311 feet). The Milkipur Constituency is surrounded by Gomti and Tamsa rivers.

Demographics
 India census, Milkipur had a population of 1,764. Males constitute 52% of the population and females 48%. Milkipur has an average literacy rate of 52%, lower than the national average of 59.5%; with male literacy of 63% and female literacy of 39%. 17% of the population is under 6 years of age.

Climate

Milkipur has a warm humid subtropical climate with cool, dry winters from December to February and dry, hot summers from March to July. The rainy season is from mid-June to mid-September, when Milkipur gets an average rainfall of 1010 mm (40 in) mostly from the south-west monsoon winds. In winter the maximum temperature is around 25 degrees Celsius and the minimum is in the 2 to 3 degrees Celsius range. Fog is quite common from late December to late January. Summers are very hot with temperatures ranging from 35 to 45 degree Celsius.

Festivals
All major Festivals Like Holi, Deepawali, Ramnavmi, Eid, Vijayadashami etc. are celebrated with full zeal and joy.

Banks
Milkipur has morden banking facilities. All the major banks like Allahabad Bank, State Bank Of India, Bank of Baroda, Canara Bank and Baroda Uttar Grameen Bank have their branches in Milkipur.

Transport

Air
Ayodhya Airport (Ayodhya) (40 km) and Lucknow airport (115 km) are the nearby airports from Milkipur town.

Road
Milkipur is situated at National Highway 330A and it has good road connectivity with Lucknow (115 km), Faizabad (32 km), Rudauli (23 km) and Jagdishpur (30 km).

Railway 
Rudauli, Faizabad Junction (Ayodhya Cantt), Ayodhya Junction, Goshainganj and Chaure Bazar are the nearby railway stations from Milkipur.

Education

Narendra Dev University Of Agriculture and Technology
Narendra Dev University of Agriculture and Technology is an agricultural university at Faizabad district in the Indian state of Uttar Pradesh. It is in the small town of Milkipur Constituency known as Kumarganj.

On 15 January 1974 the foundation stone of Narendra Dev University of Agriculture & Technology was led by the prime minister of India Indira Gandhi at Masodha near Faizabad. Shri Laxmi narain Rai, APCS officer of Agriculture Department, government of UP, was deputed as officer on special duty. After a few month, he was succeeded by Dr. A.S. Srivastava he took over in October, 1974. Some speed work was done by his team. A new development took place during 1975 and the government of UP decided to locate the main campus of the university in Milkipur at kumarganj, Faizabad instead of Masodha. Shri A.D. Pandey, IAS officer (retired) was appointed the first vice chancellor of the university on 10 October 1975. The university started functioning in a borrowed building of Gram Swavlambi Vidyalaya Acharya Nagar Naka Faizabad. DR. R.P.Chandola joined as the first Registrar of the university in November 1975. A committee was constituted for the site selection of Academy administrative and residential blocks of the university at Kumarganj. The committee submitted its report on 22 January 1976. On 10 July 1976 the paddy research station located at, Masodha, Gahghara Ghat and ECF and NDS schemes were transferred to the university by the government and U.P. institute Agril. science Kanpur which formed the nucleus of the research university. Dr.Kirti Singh took over the first Dean of the Agril. faculty on 12 February 1977 which approved creation of 20 departments in the college of agriculture.

The Mahamaya college of Agriculture Engineering and Technology(MCAET) a constituent college of N.D. university of Agriculture and Technology, Kumarganj, Faizabad was established at Ambedkar Nagar by upgrading the department of agriculture of the college of agriculture to cater the needs of development of engineering and Technology to suit the condition of the farmers of Eastern Uttar Pradesh characterised by problems of user lands, water looked poorly drained soils scant power supply, small holdings, low purchasing power and poor rural infrastructure. Former Prime Minister of India Smt. Indira Gandhi Laid Foundation stone of NDUAT on 10 October 1975 Narendra Deva University of Agriculture and Technology, Narendra Nagar (Kumarganj), named after a great national leader, educationist, philosopher and great socialist, Achraya Narendra Deva whose ideals constitute a great national heritage and source of inspiration in the national quest for a progressive economy free from the fear and exploitation.

Media

Press
Milkipur is fully covered by prominent Hindi newspapers like Dainik jagran, Amar Ujala, Hindustan, Jan Morcha etc.

Radio
The Following Radio Stations Can be listened in Milkipur.
 All India Radio
 FM Faizabad 101.9 MHz
 Radio City Lucknow 91.1 MHz
 Radio Mirchi Lucknow 98.3 MHz
 FM Rainbow Lucknow 100.7 MHz
 FM RADIO Kumarganj

Internet
Major Broadband Internet providers in Milkipur are BSNL, Reliance Jio, Bharti Airtel, Vodafone and Idea.

References

Cities and towns in Faizabad district